Matan Hozez (born 12 August 1996) is an Israeli association footballer who plays as an attacking midfielder for Israeli Premier League club Maccabi Tel Aviv.

Early life 
Hozez was born in Tel Aviv-Jaffa, Israel, to a family of Sephardic Jewish descent.

Honours

Club

Maccabi Tel Aviv
 Israeli Premier League (1): 2019-20
 Toto Cup (1): 2020-21
 Israel Super Cup (1): 2020

References

1996 births
Living people
Israeli Sephardi Jews
Israeli Mizrahi Jews
Israeli footballers
Maccabi Tel Aviv F.C. players
Beitar Tel Aviv Bat Yam F.C. players
Hapoel Ashkelon F.C. players
Bnei Yehuda Tel Aviv F.C. players
Hapoel Haifa F.C. players
Liga Leumit players
Israeli Premier League players
Footballers from Tel Aviv
Association football forwards